On the Track of Unknown Animals is a cryptozoological book by the Belgian-French zoologist Bernard Heuvelmans that was first published in 1955 under the title Sur la Piste des Bêtes Ignorées. The English translation by Richard Garnett was published in 1958 with some updating by the author and with a foreword by Gerald Durrell. A revised and abridged edition was published in 1965, and a further edition in 1995. It is credited with introducing the term cryptozoology and established its author as the "Father of Cryptozoology."

Subject 
As one reviewer explained, it is a book "about animals that might exist." On the Track of Unknown Animals cites animals that had only been discovered relatively recently, such as the pygmy chimpanzee, coelacanth, Komodo dragon and giant panda; and those that are believed to have become extinct relatively recently, such as the moa and Tasmanian tiger. A major theme is that these animals were generally known to local peoples, but their stories were dismissed by visiting zoologists, particularly the okapi.

The author then discusses evidence for mystery animals from all over the world including the Mokele-mbembe, sea serpents and the Yeti, with an extensive bibliography. He begins by complaining that "The Press has made such a laughing-stock of the Loch Ness Monster... that no scientific commission has ever dared tackle the problem" and ends with the wish that any new species are not merely slaughtered for trophies: "Have pity on them all, for it is we who are the real monsters."

Reviewers praised the breadth of study, careful citation and the author's knowledge but it was criticized for being somewhat shallow and "overly long and rambling."

Contents
 Part 1: The Great Days of Zoology are Not Done
 Part 2: The Man-Faced Animals of South-East Asia
 Part 3: The Living Fossils of Oceania
 Part 4: Riddles of the Green Continent
 Part 5: The Giants of the Far North
 Part 6: The Lesson of the Malagasy Ghosts

Bibliography
Sur la Piste des Bêtes Ignorées by Bernard Heuvelmans, Libraire Plon, 1955
On the Track of Unknown Animals by Bernard Heuvelmans, trans Richard Garnett, Rupert Hart-Davis, 1958
On the Track of Unknown Animals by Bernard Heuvelmans, Paperback – Abridged, MIT Press, 22 May 1972, 
Sur la Piste des Bêtes Ignorées by Bernard Heuvelmans, 2nd edition, 1982
On the Track of Unknown Animals by Bernard Heuvelmans, Kegan Paul, 3rd revised edition, 1995 
On the Track of Unknown Animals by Bernard Heuvelmans, Routledge, 3rd edition, Kindle format, 10 July 2014

References

External links

Cryptozoology
Zoology books
1955 books
French books